The 2019 NTT IndyCar Series was the 24th season of the IndyCar Series and the 108th official championship season of American open wheel racing. The premier event was the 2019 Indianapolis 500, with Will Power entering as the defending winner. Honda entered as the defending Manufacturers' Cup champion. Scott Dixon entered the season as the defending National Champion.

Josef Newgarden won his second Drivers' Championship, while Honda won the Manufacturers' Championship for the second year in a row, and it was the manufacturer's first championship of the Reiwa era. Rookie of the Year honors went to Felix Rosenqvist.

Series news
On March 21, 2018, NBC Sports announced that it would become the sole United States television rights holder under a new three-year contract, replacing the previous split between ABC and NBC Sports' cable network NBCSN (whose involvement in the series dated back to its tenure as Versus, prior to Comcast's acquisition of NBC). Eight races per-season will air on NBC, including the Indianapolis 500 (ending a run of 54 consecutive editions aired by ABC), and supplemental digital content is offered through NBC Sports' subscription product NBC Sports Gold. As with the previous contracts, the majority of races air on NBCSN.
 On November 5, 2018, IndyCar announced that it had formed a new division known as IndyCar Media to manage the series' international media rights (replacing ESPN International).
 On November 27, 2018, IndyCar announced that Speedway had signed a multi-year sponsorship agreement to be the official fuel provider of IndyCar beginning in 2019, replacing Sunoco after nine years as a fuel provider as the company elected to concentrating on NASCAR and NHRA fuel partnerships.
All entrants will use 2018-specification engines through the 2020 season as the series concentrates on developing the new 2021 engines.
 On December 17, 2018, it was announced that Jay Frye had been promoted to president of IndyCar.
 On January 15, 2019, IndyCar announced NTT as the new series title sponsor on a multi-year deal, along with becoming the official technology partner of the series and Indianapolis 500. Verizon Communications had previously ended its title sponsorship of the series after the 2018 season.
 On February 6, 2019 it was announced that Firestone Tire and Rubber Company had signed an extension to remain as the series' sole tire supplier through the 2025 season.

Confirmed entries
The following teams, entries, and drivers have been announced to compete in the 2019 NTT IndyCar Series season. All teams will use a spec Dallara DW12 chassis with UAK18 aero kit and Firestone tires.

Team changes
On September 19, 2018, it was announced that George Michael Steinbrenner IV's Steinbrenner Racing would join forces with Harding Racing to form a planned two-car operation under the name Harding Steinbrenner Racing. On February 11, it was revealed that the team's second engine lease was only for the Indianapolis 500.

Meyer Shank Racing, after running a 6-race schedule in 2018, expanded their season to 10 races in the 2019 season with driver Jack Harvey.

On October 17, 2018, it was announced that Ed Carpenter Racing and Scuderia Corsa would team up to field Ed Jones in all road and street course events and the Indianapolis 500.

On November 10, 2018 it was announced that McLaren Racing would return to the IndyCar Series at the 2019 Indianapolis 500 with Fernando Alonso behind the wheel. On November 26, 2018, it was revealed that McLaren's entry would be powered by Chevrolet.

On December 6, 2018 it was also announced that Harding Steinbrenner Racing will switch to Honda engines from 2019 season beyond after spending two seasons with Chevrolet engines.

On December 17, 2018, it was announced that DragonSpeed would make their IndyCar debut in 2019, in a 5-race program including the 2019 Indianapolis 500.  The entry will be powered by Chevrolet and piloted by Ben Hanley, who will make his IndyCar debut along with the team.

On February 28, 2019, Dreyer & Reinbold Racing announced that they would once again return to run the Indy 500, retaining driver Sage Karam for the fourth consecutive year. On April 22, the team announced that J. R. Hildebrand would return to drive for the team at the Indy 500 for the second year in a row, this time driving with the No. 48 to honor Dan Gurney.

Driver changes
After both running the final race of the 2018 season at Sonoma with Harding Racing, 2018 Indy Lights champion Patricio O'Ward and runner-up Colton Herta were announced to run the full season with the new partnership of Harding Steinbrenner Racing. However, on February 11, O'Ward and HSR parted ways after the team was unable to support a full-season program for O'Ward. O'Ward later moved to Carlin where he will drive the No. 31 car in 13 races, including the Indianapolis 500 as the team's third entry as Charlie Kimball will race the No. 23 car at the event.

On September 28, 2018, Chip Ganassi Racing announced that they had signed Felix Rosenqvist to drive for the team during the 2019 season. He will replace Ed Jones in the No. 10 car.

On October 17, 2018, Ed Carpenter Racing announced Ed Jones would replace Jordan King driving the No. 20 car on road courses and street circuits. Jones will also drive the No. 63 car in the Indianapolis 500 as Ed Carpenter will continue driving the No. 20 car on ovals.

On October 30, 2018, Schmidt Peterson Motorsports announced that Formula One driver Marcus Ericsson would join the team for the 2019 season to replace the disabled Robert Wickens, though Ericsson will be racing the No. 7 car instead of Wickens' No. 6, which remains open if or "when he wants and is able to return".

On November 14, 2018, Rahal Letterman Lanigan Racing announced that Jordan King would join the team for the Indianapolis 500.

On January 30, 2019, Andretti Autosport announced that Conor Daly would join the team for the Indianapolis 500. On August 8, 2019, Andretti Autosport announced that Daly would return to the team for the final race of the season at Laguna Seca.

On May 31, 2019, Trevor Carlin revealed that Patricio O'Ward would not be competing at the Iowa and Gateway rounds, but the second Carlin car would be run at those two events. In late June, Red Bull announced that O'Ward would be replacing Dan Ticktum at Team Mugen in Super Formula. With this move to another series, and well-known budgetary restrictions after his crash at Indianapolis, O'Ward's rookie IndyCar season was cut short after only 8 races. On July 2, Carlin announced that Sage Karam would take O'Ward's seat in the No. 31 car at Toronto, which was then extended to Iowa. On July 23, Carlin announced that RC Enerson would drive the No. 31 car for the round at Mid-Ohio. Charlie Kimball filled in the final two gaps in the schedule at Gateway and Portland, expanding his planned 5-race schedule to 7 races.

On June 4, 2019, Carlin announced that Max Chilton would not be competing in the last 4 oval events of the season at Texas, Iowa, Pocono, and Gateway. Conor Daly was announced as the driver of the No. 59 car at Texas on the same day, and the No. 59 car will continue to be run for the full season. It was announced on August 12 that Daly would compete in the last two oval races at Pocono and Gateway in the No. 59 car.

On August 29, 2019, it was announced that Marcus Ericsson had been called up by Alfa Romeo Racing in Formula One to be on reserve driver duty at the Belgian Grand Prix. Conor Daly was announced at the same time to be replacing Ericsson for the round at Portland.

Schedule 
All races were in the United States apart from the Toronto round.

Schedule changes and notes
 On June 22, 2018, it was announced that the Phoenix race at ISM Raceway would not be on the 2019 schedule.
 On June 24, 2018, IndyCar and Road America announced a three-year contract extension, keeping the circuit under contract through the 2021 season.
 On July 17, 2018, it was announced that Laguna Seca will be added to the schedule on a three-year contract and will be the 2019 season finale. The event will replace the Indy Grand Prix of Sonoma. It will be the first event there since the 2004 Champ Car season.
 On July 30, 2018, it was announced the Iowa 300 will return to a Saturday night race.
 On August 10, 2018, it was announced that Pocono Raceway will return in 2019.
 On August 16, 2018, an interview with IndyCar's Stephen Starks revealed that Portland would return, while Barber's date could move to early April which in the final schedule it did.
 On August 23, 2018, Texas Motor Speedway confirmed a multi-year agreement to host the IndyCar Series through 2022.
 On September 4, 2018, a March 24, 2019 race was announced at Circuit of the Americas. The Austin American-Statesman reported a 5-year contract for the venue.

Results

Points standings

 Ties are broken by number of wins, followed by number of 2nds, 3rds, etc.; then by finishing position in the previous race; then by random draw.

Driver standings
 At all races except the Indy 500, the pole position qualifier earns one point. The top nine Indy 500 qualifiers receive points, descending from 9 points for the pole position. At double header races, the fastest qualifier of each qualifying group earns one point.
 One point is awarded to each driver who leads at least one race lap. Two additional points are awarded to the driver who leads most laps during a race.
 Entrant-initiated engine change-outs before the engine reaches their required distance run will result in the loss of ten points.

Entrant standings 

 Based on the entrant, used for oval qualifications order, and starting grids when qualifying is cancelled.
 Only full-time entrants, and at-large part-time entrants shown.

Manufacturer standings
 All manufacturer points (including qualifying points, race finish points, and race win bonus points) can only be earned by full-season entrants, and provided they are using their four engine allocation. Ineligible cars are removed from the finishing order used for race finish points.
 The top two finishing entrants from each manufacturer in each race score points for their respective manufacturer. The manufacturer that wins each race will be awarded five additional points.
 At all races except the Indy 500, the manufacturer who qualifies on pole earns one point. At the Indy 500, the fastest Saturday qualifier earns one point, while the pole position winner on Sunday earns two points.
 For every full-season engine used during the Indy 500 that reaches 2,000 total miles run, the manufacturer earns bonus points equal to that engine's finishing position in the race.

See also
2019 Indy Lights
2019 Indy Pro 2000 Championship
2019 U.S. F2000 National Championship

Footnotes

References

External links
 

 
IndyCar Series seasons
IndyCar Series
IndyCar Series